Artur Ashotovich Danielian (born 17 December 2003) is a Russian figure skater. He is the 2020 European silver medalist, the 2020 Russian national silver medalist, and the 2018 World Junior silver medalist.

Personal life 
Danielian was born on 17 December 2003 in Volgograd, Russia. He is the youngest of three children. He is of Armenian descent.

Career

Early years 
Danielian began learning to skate in 2008, after an ice rink opened near his home in Volgograd. In 2016, he moved to Moscow and joined CSKA Moscow. Marina Selitskaia and Elena Buianova became his coaches.

2017–2018 season 
In September 2017, Danielian competed at his first Junior Grand Prix (JGP) assignment, placing seventh in Zagreb, Croatia. In February 2018, he won the bronze medal at the 2018 Russian Junior Championships.

In March, Danielian competed at the 2018 World Junior Championships in Sofia, Bulgaria.  He won the silver medal, behind teammate Alexey Erokhov, after placing eighth in the short program and second in the free skate.

2018–2019 season 
Danielian started his season by competing in the 2018 JGP series. At his first JGP event of the season, he placed fifth in Ljubljana, Slovenia. At his second JGP event, he placed fourth in Yerevan, Armenia.  Danielian next competed at the 2018 Tallinn Trophy, where he won a gold medal.

Though only fifth at the 2019 Russian Junior Championships, Danielian was nevertheless sent to the 2019 World Junior Championships. This happened because junior champion Daniil Samsonov was not age-eligible to compete internationally and fourth-place finisher Erokhov withdrew. At the Junior Worlds, Danielian placed ninth in the short program, fifth in the free skating and fourth overall, with a new personal best score of 220.68 points.

2019–2020 season 
Competing on the Junior Grand Prix, Danielian won silver medals at both JGP Russia and JGP Croatia, ending up as first alternate to the Junior Grand Prix Final.  Making his senior international debut on the Challenger series at 2019 CS Golden Spin of Zagreb, he placed fourth.

Competing at the 2020 Russian Championships at the senior level for the first time, Danielian was only thirteenth in the short program but skated a clean free program, winning that segment outright amidst rough performances from those who placed ahead in the short program.  As a result, he rose to the silver medal position.  

Danielian's performance earned him a berth at the 2020 European Championships, where he placed third in the short program despite stepping out of his triple Axel. Though he placed fourth in the free skate, he won the silver medal overall.

Danielan was assigned to compete at the 2020 World Championships in Montreal, but these were cancelled as a result of the coronavirus pandemic.

2020–2021 season 
An ankle injury forced Danielian to withdraw from the senior Russian test skates. Danielian was scheduled to make his Grand Prix debut at the 2020 Rostelecom Cup, but withdrew due to his surgical recovery.  He subsequently withdrew from the Russian Championships for the same reason.

2021–2022 season 
Danielian returned to international competition at the 2021 Skate America, where he placed tenth. He was tenth as well at the 2021 Internationaux de France.

At the 2022 Russian Championships, Danielian finished in thirteenth place.

2022-2023 season 
It was announced in August that Danielian had switched coaches from Elena Buyanova to Evgeni Rukavicin.

Programs

Records and achievements 
 Set the junior-level men's record for the short program with a score of 83.31 points at the 2019 JGP Russia.

Competitive highlights 
GP: Grand Prix; CS: Challenger Series; JGP: Junior Grand Prix

Detailed results 
Small medals for short and free programs awarded only at ISU Championships.

Senior

Junior

References

External links 
 
 
 

! colspan="3" style="border-top: 5px solid #78FF78;" |World Junior Record Holders

2003 births
Russian male single skaters
World Junior Figure Skating Championships medalists
Living people
Sportspeople from Volgograd
Russian sportspeople of Armenian descent
Russian people of Armenian descent
European Figure Skating Championships medalists